Andrei Vladimirovich Kozlov (born 23 February 1989) is a Russian professional football player. He plays as a forward for FC Amkar Perm.

Club career
On 27 June 2019, he returned to FC Ufa.

References

External links
 
 

1989 births
Sportspeople from Bryansk
Living people
Russian footballers
Association football forwards
FC Fakel Voronezh players
FC Ufa players
FC Torpedo Moscow players
FC Khimki players
FC Volga Nizhny Novgorod players
FC Yenisey Krasnoyarsk players
FC Orenburg players
FC Novokuznetsk players
FC Dynamo Bryansk players
FC Urozhay Krasnodar players
FC Rotor Volgograd players
FC Amkar Perm players
Russian Premier League players
Russian First League players
Russian Second League players